William Fontaine de La Tour Dauterive (born June 22, 1953) is a fictional character on the Fox animated series King of the Hill. He is the Hills' bald, overweight, divorced, and clinically depressed neighbor, voiced by Stephen Root and named for series producer Jim Dauterive.

Production

Stephen Root used his background in Southern theatre to help him develop the voice of Bill. Root attended the University of Florida, and had performed in Southern plays in New York City prior to being chosen for the role. He originally auditioned for the role of Dale Gribble, which "didn't feel right", so he then auditioned for Bill.

Personality

Bill is indicated as coming from an upper-class Cajun family in Louisiana: the family lived on a vast estate called the Chateau D'Haute Rive ("castle on the high bank") until his cousin, Gilbert, was forced to sell it. He speaks fluent Cajun French and plays the accordion skillfully, which surprises him just as much as it does everyone else. His father was abusive, spanking him regularly, locking him in a rabbit hutch, and making him wear dresses (Bill attempts to justify these actions when he mentions them). As of the season 2 episode "The Final Shinsult", Bill's father is presumably still alive (though slowing down in his later years), based upon Bill's remark to Hank that his father "can't even load a hunting rifle anymore," with Bill further commenting that he has to "practically put it in his hands and pull the trigger." By the time of the season 4 episode "A Beer Can Named Desire," Bill's only living male relative is his dandified cousin Gilbert, who still lives in Louisiana. By season 11, the two are guardians of the family's secret barbecue sauce recipe, which Gilbert refuses to allow Bill to sell. (However, Bill eventually gives the recipe to Bobby Hill so he can pass it on to his children, thus keeping the Dauterive tradition alive). Though Bill says he never had any children of his own, there is an opened possibility of him getting one or both of his dead cousins' widows pregnant during his stay at the family mansion while Hank was trying to win money by throwing a football into a big Alamo beer can at the Louisiana Superdome during halftime of the Dallas Cowboys–New Orleans Saints game.

Although overweight, balding, and emotionally needy in his later years, Bill was a muscular, confident athlete with long-flowing hair in his youth. Nicknamed "The Billdozer", he held Arlen High's career touchdown record until a young athlete named Ricky Suggs broke it years later. Ricky, however, is simply allowed to score the record-breaking touchdown by the other team due to a torn ACL, rather than playing injured as Bill would have; to regain his honor Bill rejoins the team to score one last touchdown and re-tie the record (he had redshirt eligibility due to joining the Army during his senior year). Bill's bright future was derailed when he attended a Molly Hatchet concert and found his future wife Lenore passed out in his lap in 1991; she would go on to cheat on and humiliate Bill before finally leaving him a broken shell of his former self. Although there appear to be several factors, it can generally be assumed that her leaving him was the major cause of his downward spiral. In the episode "Order of the Straight Arrow", Bill says "I'm so depressed, I can't even blink", upon the reminiscence of his childhood days as an Arrow Scout and remembering his wishes to be a free-spirited pilot like his father. Bill's negative self-concept is clearly displayed in the episode "A Firefighting We Will Go"; Bill, Dale, Hank, and Boomhauer recall an evening's events, and, while the other three characters imagine themselves in a positive light, Bill imagines himself as being balder, fatter, and more of a glutton than he is in reality. Despite all of this, Bill is loyal and brave in the face of adversity, rescuing the Hills from their house after smelling a gas leak and resuscitating both Peggy and Hank on their front lawn afterwards.

Bill is often a foil for his friends, who verbally and emotionally put him down on a regular basis, either because they don't realize how hurtful their remarks are or because Bill is too dimwitted to mind very much. He is the first person to be mentioned when any character refers to losers or bemoans a misfortune for fear their lives will be ruined, like his. For example, Hank, while telling Peggy that a lawn "makes a man" and gives him a purpose, says "Without my lawn, I am Bill," which provokes a shudder from Peggy. Conversely, Bill greatly admires Hank and often seeks his advice before doing anything, and for his help when in trouble. He is usually quick to help his friends and occasionally gets dragged into Dale's crazy schemes; however, he is frequently unreliable. In particular, Bill handles pressure very poorly; he is bad at keeping secrets, and he is quick to panic if a situation becomes tense. He is also shown to be quite gullible and easily manipulated, due in part to his low self-esteem. Of all his acquaintances, Boomhauer and Hank seems to be the ones who gives him the most respect.

Bill has an obsessive crush on Peggy, and frequently makes bumbling, inappropriate remarks about her. Although Bill always speaks highly of Peggy and looks to her as the epitome of desire, she looks at him with total contempt. There are popular fan rumors that Bobby Hill is actually Bill's biological son, due to similarities in appearance, Hank's narrow urethra, Bill's crush on Peggy, and Peggy's disgust towards Bill.

Although Bill's friends are often disgusted or frustrated at his stupidity and unreliability, they were devastated when it appeared that he had sacrificed himself to save them when they were stuck on a military target zone, with Hank saying that he was a good friend – sweet, loyal, and brave. During their high school years, as they have one last blowout in Bill's honor as he's being shipped off, a drunken Hank stirs up a fight with a thug at a bar, but Bill intervenes and saves Hank. On some occasions, Bill will fight back, and relentlessly, if pushed enough.

When examining Bill's Army medical history, Dale discovered that Bill was unknowingly made part in an experiment called "Operation: Infinite Walrus", to create a hybrid soldier capable of operating in freezing cold waters. It is assumed that the experimental drugs are the cause of his weight gain, excessive body hair, baldness, and terrible body odor and breath until it's revealed that he was in the control group given a placebo. Bill is also shown to have a severe but easily treatable foot fungus, which actually comes in handy once to help Hank get revenge on a fraudulent mold inspector. Bill was diagnosed with diabetes and was told he would lose his ability to walk, but then later this was contradicted by the inept diagnosing doctor, who says that he only said Bill was likely to lose his ability to walk from diabetes. Originally the doctor made it seem like Bill would ultimately need to use a wheelchair. (Later, Bill beats him up for this, with Hank standing guard.) Ironically, this "diagnosis" leads Bill to a depressed slump, where he meets Thunder, a wheelchair-using muscle man who plays a wheelchair-friendly version of Rugby. This then leads Bill to get into better shape while playing the sport and this cured his diabetes.

Bill's personal hygiene and other habits are shown to be very poor. As previously mentioned, he has severe foot fungus, terrible breath, and body odor (when opening the hatch of a tank Bill had stolen, Hank believed there was a dead animal inside due to the smell). Various comments indicate that he doesn't shower or brush his teeth on a regular basis. Bobby states that he has dandruff in spite of being bald. He is regularly shown eating food he finds in or under his couch, and has even been shown to eat food without dishes (as in one episode where he was cooking himself spaghetti, where he broke his only plate and was forced to eat the spaghetti off of his counter and drink the jar of sauce he was going to serve with it). He dumps garbage directly out his kitchen window, despite having a garbage can. He has been shown to fall asleep while eating snacks, which attracts animals into his bedroom, though he seems incredulous or apathetic to this. His bathroom is described as disgusting, when asked if they would rather endure a dangerous and painful stunt (such as sticking a wasp up one's nose) or shower in Bill's bathroom, his friends always choose the former. When assigned tasks to get his house ready for a family reunion after Nancy and Peggy are assigned the bathroom, both are horrified and desperately try to change assignments. He also has a foot fetish, finding Peggy's unnaturally over-sized feet very appealing, and even tries to take her discarded full-body cast as she convalesces following a disastrous skydive.

Bill is also portrayed as being the poorest of Hank's friends. However, he resides in a similar looking house as all the other members of the main cast (one episode reveals he won it in his divorce). Moreover, although Bill is portrayed as poor, he is often seen spending money on extravagant or needless items. This is likely because he generally does not date, nor has any family, leaving him with extra income. Moreover, while Dale and Nancy cannot afford a plastic surgery in the episode "Trouble With The Gribbles", Bill offers to pay for it himself, signifying that he may be wealthier than the Gribble family.

Despite being physically out of shape, a target of many pranks, and incompetent in many areas, Bill is a highly skilled barber, as depicted in the episodes "Hank's Bad Hair Day" and "My Hair Lady." When the Army eliminates its barbers in the former episode, the commander of the base where Bill is stationed creates a fictitious Military Occupational Specialty as a cover for him to continue working as a barber.

Physical appearance 
Bill Dauterive is overweight and balding, and often falls victim to Dale's harassment. Possibly because of low self-esteem and depression, Bill does not regularly brush his teeth, shower, or exercise, only doing these things when dating a woman. When introducing himself to a lawnmower focus group in "Nine Pretty Darn Angry Men", he states that he is 5'8". Although currently overweight, Bill is shown to be in incredible shape when first joining the army and, when met by old friends, they are generally surprised to see how out of shape he became. He is depicted as not meeting the Army's Physical Fitness Standards; however, he manages to pass by accidents such as the instructor failing to score him and not wanting to redo the test, or injuring himself prior to the test. In the episode "Tankin' to the Streets", Dale suggests that Bill's weight problems stem from a military program designed to create walrus-like soldiers to fight the Russians in the Arctic. However, Bill was a member of the placebo group. The likely source of his weight problems comes from depression, due to his wife leaving him.

Despite being the most overweight out of the show's main characters, Bill does on occasion show glimpses of the athleticism he once possessed. In the episode "Bills are Made to be Broken", Bill is allowed to return to high school to regain his touchdown record, because he never graduated and manages to score, despite the best efforts of the defense. Also in the episode "Bulk and the Body Buddies", Bill is shown to be able to bulk up and gain muscle relatively fast when he allows a group of muscle builders to work out in his garage. Although Bill is typically easily bullied by his friends, the times he does decide to stand up to himself people generally back away from him, suggesting he is physically intimidating, despite being overweight, while Dale routinely threatens individuals to no effect due to his small stature.

Bill is also shown as being very tough, while Dale trembles at even the thought of pain, Bill is typically shown working through injuries. In the episode "Bill of Sales", he is shown to be a competent sales man and Peggy uses him to win a sales contest, it is shown that Bill works hardest when he is insulted, so Peggy continues to push him until his feet begin to bleed. Although Bill continued to work, Peggy fired him out of guilt for taking advantage of him and also pushing him to the point of physical injury.

Romantic relationships 
Bill Dauterive's ex-wife was named Lenore, who was seen and voiced in the episode "Hank and the Great Glass Elevator", attempting to worm her way back into Bill's life when he became high-profile while dating former Texas governor Ann Richards. During the early seasons, he often pined for Lenore to return after she ran out on him, but he was somewhat successful in getting over her in the episode "Pretty Pretty Dresses" after Hank resorts to pretending to be Lenore. Bill then finally symbolically confronts Lenore for leaving him, and after being told "I don't love you anymore" he becomes enraged and yells "You don't deserve William Fontaine de la Tour Dauterive!". During "Hank and the Great Glass Elevator", Lenore tries ordering Bill around in front of Ann Richards but he finally tells her off by mooning her. Other relationships include Luanne's mother Leanne Platter ("Leanne's Saga"), which ended when she reverted to her drunken violent ways and stole his truck, and Kahn's mother Laoma Souphanousinphone ("Maid in Arlen"), which was broken up by interference from Kahn, who convinced Bill that his mother was in love with astronaut Harrison Schmitt, but they then found out Kahn had been lying because seeing the two of them together disgusted him, and reunited with Kahn grudgingly saying they seemed right together (the show originally intended for Bill and Laoma to remain together, but the writing staff changed that plan and simply wrote her out of the series so Bill could remain unlucky in love to comedic effect, although their relationship is briefly mentioned in one subsequent episode). He also had a brief, mostly sexual, relationship with two of his cousins' widows ("A Beer Can Named Desire"). In the episode "The Untitled Blake McCormick Project," Bill dates a woman named Charlene, and she even moves in with him, however Charlene's past with John Redcorn complicates matters.  In a later season, he dated Reverend Karen Stroup for a time and even moved her in with him. When Reverend Stroup and Bill began dating, her congregation showed massive disapproval of their Reverend dating anyone, especially Bill. This meant that they had to carry out their relationship in secret. To Bill, this was exciting. He enjoyed the fact that they were having a relationship that was viewed as immoral by their peers. Unfortunately for Bill, when the pressure became too much for Stroup, she stepped down from her Reverendcy so that they could date like normal people. Bill ultimately broke up with Stroup because he found the relationship was no longer exciting when it was not a secret. Due to his ability to keep going after virtually any rejection, Bill is the one able to snap Boomhauer out of his depression when rejected by a woman he truly had feelings for.

Peggy Hill has said and done many cruel things to Bill, both to his face and behind his back with no regards to his feeling. Bill only seems to recognize that Peggy hates him in the aftermath of her making that clear, and forgets entirely about this reality every time he sees her or talks about her again. Peggy may have subconscious desires to injure Bill, even though she doesn't actively try to hurt him physically. For example, during a game of baseball, she once accidentally threw a bean-ball at his head, knocking him to the ground. She then mistakenly threw another at his crotch, putting him in excruciating pain and humiliation. She stole his prized American flag and accidentally destroyed it, driving him to absolute tears. Another time, angry at his endless pursuit of her, she hit him once at a game, she inadvertently wound up knocking him off the bleachers—his arm later in a sling. She killed off his character in the video game "Pro-Pain"—once again, making him cry. She, Dale and Minh studied him to make money for their investing endeavors, but eventually dropped him when he became conscious of it all—deepening his depression. Despite all of this, she says she considers him "a friend", and the series de-emphasized the Peggy-Bill dynamic when she met someone she loathed far more than Bill: Luanne's white-trash boyfriend (later husband) Lucky.

Work  
Bill holds the fictional military occupational specialty "barber" in the United States Army under Ft. Blanda's H company, 110th infantry. His rank has been revealed through dialogue, in scenes of him wearing obsolete olive drab fatigues as being sergeant, and he appears to wear the insignia of E-5 on his Class A uniform in the episode "Old Glory". He has never deployed in his Army career. He briefly served as a recruiter when his position was eliminated for being wasteful, but it was secretly restored when Hank donated a new chair, with a cover job as an electrician. He speaks four to six languages (English, French, and Tagalog for sure), of which he used at least four in the army. It is revealed in one episode that as an athletic young man entering the army, he wanted to serve in the armored cavalry in a tank crew. He also was briefly a professional hair stylist with Luanne at the trendy salon Hottyz until it was discovered he wasn't homosexual. Bill and Luanne eventually worked for Hank's barber, Jack, which brought in a young adult clientele and saved Jack from going out of business.

Several times throughout the series Bill is revealed to be very talented at cutting hair. When Hank receives a bad hair cut, Bill is able to fix it quite easily. He revealed to Hank that he dyed the hair of 53 officers who serve at Ft. Blanda. When given other military duties such as recruiting, he has no success. While working at Hottyz, a high style salon, Bill and Luanne pitch together to host a chair. Luanne increases her sex appeal and Bill pretends to be gay so he will not offend women. They quickly rise to become "first chair." In another episode, it is revealed that the General of the base will not allow anyone besides Bill to cut his hair.

When he is engaged by other pursuits, such as when he toured with a choir group called the Harmonoholics or when he decided to run his own halfway house, Bill uses up all his personal and sick days from the army almost to the point of going AWOL; otherwise he doesn't use them at all because he has no real hobbies and when he travels (which isn't common) it's with his friends to locations in Texas and inside a given weekend. He is described as being nice but often depressed and lonely; his overwhelming need to make people like him makes him easily taken advantage of, particularly by Dale. He is overwhelmingly patriotic. When an American Flag is due to be disposed of by burning (as is principal practice), he offers to take the flag and hoist it over his home. When Kahn dares to so much as attempt to lower the flag, Bill lunges at Kahn fiercely. When the flag is destroyed, Bill cries terribly.

In the episode "Bill of Sales" it is also suggested that Bill has emotionally masochistic tendencies, which factors into his barely concealed lust for Peggy despite how much she dislikes him most of the time. When Peggy is impressed by Bill's super-salesman work, mostly because it benefits her, she sincerely praises him and is shocked when he immediately becomes angry and dismissive and abruptly ends the conversation. When a confused Peggy tells Hank that she tried to, "'motivate' him, business term, with a little 'praise', my term, he goes plumb loco, Spanish term." Hank's response, "You must have confused him; being dumped on is all Bill knows" leads Peggy to conclude that "Bill has had a hard life and he likes it that way" and subsequently refers to him as a "nut job". She manages to persuade him to go back to work for her by verbally abusing him. However, she soon fires him out of feelings of guilt for taking advantage of his low self-esteem. They end the episode on better terms than they started, both having a stronger idea of who the other person really is. 

According to Drawn to Television by M. Keith Booker, Bill "is a lonely figure who adds a touch of pathos to the humor of King of the Hill, which is often bittersweet."  Jim Bawden of the Toronto Star describes Bill as a "sad sack".  Voicing Bill and a couple other characters on the show is Stephen Root's favorite job.

References

External links 

King of the Hill characters
Fictional hairdressers
Fictional Cajuns
Fictional characters from Louisiana
Fictional characters from Texas
Television characters introduced in 1997
Animated characters introduced in 1997
Fictional military sergeants
Fictional players of American football
Fictional United States Army personnel
Male characters in animated series
Fictional attempted suicides
Fictional victims of domestic abuse